Birdsall may refer to:

People 
 Birdsall (name)

Places 
 Birdsall, New York, United States
 Birdsall, North Yorkshire, England
 Birdsalls, Ontario, Canada

Other 
 Birdsall House, an English country house in Birdsall, North Yorkshire
 Birdsall Lime Kiln, historic structure in Decorah, Iowa, United States
 Birdsall Services Group, a US engineering, environmental and energy consulting firm